The Bond Electraglide was a solid body carbon fibre electric guitar manufactured by the Bond Guitar Company from 1984 to 1986. The Electraglide is visually styled on the Gibson Melody Maker (with the 1962–onwards double cut-away), with a unique stepped anodized aluminum fingerboard instead of traditional frets. 

Pickup switching, volume and tone controls were completely digital, powered by a large internal motherboard, and the player selected pickups via five push-buttons; the volume, treble and bass were incremented numerically via digital rocker switches, confirmed by a three-colour LED readout. Due to the state of digital technology at the time, the system required an external power supply pack, and was relatively bulky. Between 1,000 and 1,400 guitars were produced.

The Edge of U2 used the guitar extensively on The Joshua Tree, including the solo on "One Tree Hill", as well as on "Exit", and "Mothers of the Disappeared". He said of the guitar: "The strings started to vibrate on the fretboard... the guitar having no true frets, it created a different kind of effect. It was an attempt to sound obnoxious."

British guitarist Mick Jones is known to have used a Bond Electraglide with his band Big Audio Dynamite in the mid-1980s. Will Sergeant of Echo & the Bunnymen, John Turnbull, and Dave Stewart of Eurythmics were also Electraglide users.

The Bond Guitar Company was set up by Andrew Bond (who died in 1999) in Muir of Ord, Scotland, in 1984. The company ceased trading in 1986.

A Bond Electraglide was acquired by National Museums Scotland in 2013.

Though being quite costly at the time the company was active, they never maintained their value on the second hand market.

The Dutch guitar manufacturer Aristides Instruments endeavours on a similar path since 2007. However, they use a specifically designed composite (dubbed Arium), rather than regular carbon fibre.

History 

Andrew Bond and Ian Flooks met in 1972 when they were both conductors working for the Hants and Dorset bus company in Poole, Dorset. 

Andrew had adapted his Gibson guitar with a prototype of the ’saw tooth’ fret board and, between them, Andrew and Ian scraped together enough money to file patents for the unique fret board. They incorporated Bond Guitars Ltd as partners in 1973 and continued to adapt guitars with the new fretboard for several years.

Ian became a talent agent and, in 1979, formed his own agency, Wasted Talent. Within a year Wasted Talent had signed many of the major acts of the eighties including The Clash, Ian Dury, Talking Heads, Eurythmics and U2. 

At that time Andrew was perfecting the design of the Bond Electraglide, a revolutionary new guitar which, in addition to the hard anodised aluminium saw tooth fretboard, was made from carbon fibre - with an injection moulded body. The hollow body contained on board electronics which controlled volume, tone and pick up selection.

In order to realise this dream, Ian, with help from the Highlands and Islands Development Board, funded the opening of a factory in Muir of Ord in Northern Scotland. The factory had 40 employees, and set about building the Electraglide. The sales team at that time were Ray Haines and Kenny Smith.(Kenny later went on to manage Eurythmics). 

The first Electraglides rolled off the production line in 1984, and their use was pioneered by several Wasted Talent acts, including U2’s The Edge, Dave Stewart (Eurythmics) and Mick Jones (The Clash; Big Audio Dynamite). 

Dave Stewart, together with Andrew and Ian, took the Electraglide to the 1985 Messe Frankfurt (Frankfurt Trade Fair), and the interest in the guitar was enormous - major distribution companies in all the main territories came on board.

Wasted Talent is now a digital media company which owns Kerrang!, Mixmag and The Face.

References

Electric guitars
Musical instrument manufacturing companies of the United Kingdom